Vitexin is an apigenin flavone glucoside, a chemical compound found in the passion flower, Vitex agnus-castus (chaste tree or chasteberry), in the Phyllostachys nigra bamboo leaves, in the pearl millet (Pennisetum millet), and in Hawthorn.

Metabolism 
Goitrogenicity of millet flavones : Vitexin inhibits thyroid peroxidase thus contributing to goiter.
 Vitexin beta-glucosyltransferase
 Vitexin 2"-O-rhamnoside 7-O-methyltransferase

See also 
 Isovitexin (or homovitexin, saponaretin) is the apigenin-6-C-glucoside.
 Orientin, the 3'-OH derivative

References

External links 
 Vitexin on RDchemicals.com

Flavone glucosides
C-glycoside natural phenols